Dennis Lewis (21 April 1925 – November 1996) was a Welsh footballer who played for Torquay United for twelve years, racking up 442 appearances in the Football League (474 over all competitions). Until May 2008 he was the club's record appearance holder, Kevin Hill overcoming his tally.

Playing career
Lewis signed professional forms with Swansea Town in August 1946, but failed to make it onto the pitch for the club and so moved on to Torquay United twelve months later. He scored on his league debut, a 2–0 home win over Aldershot. He soon became an indispensable member of the first eleven, and was an ever-present for two consecutive seasons, one of which was the 1954-55 season which saw the Gulls record an historic triumph over Leeds United in the FA Cup. Between 19 November 1952 and 19 April 1957 he made a club record 207 consecutive league appearances. In June 1959 he became a member of the back-room staff at Plainmoor. After leaving the game completely he worked as a billiard table fitter.

References

1925 births
1996 deaths
Welsh footballers
Association football midfielders
Swansea City A.F.C. players
Torquay United F.C. players
English Football League players